This is a list of seasons played by UP Langreo in Spanish football, from 1961 to the most recent completed season. It details the club's achievements in major competitions, and the top scorers in league games for each season.

The club played eight seasons in Segunda División, 17 in Segunda División B and 33 in Tercera División, eight of them as the third tier in Spanish football.

Key

Key to league record:
 Pos = Final position
 Pld = Played
 W = Games won
 D = Games drawn
 L = Games lost
 GF = Goals for
 GA = Goals against
 Pts = Points

Key to playoffs record:
 PP = Promotion playoffs
 RP = Relegation playoffs
 → = Remained in the same category
 ↑ = Promoted
 ↓ = Relegated

Key to rounds:
 W = Winner
 RU = Runner-up
 SF = Semi-finals
 QF = Quarter-finals
 R16 = Round of 16
 R32 = Round of 32
 R64 = Round of 64

 6R = Sixth round
 5R = Fifth round
 4R = Fourth round
 3R = Third round
 2R = Second round
 1R = First round
 GS = Group stage

Seasons

References

External links
UP Langreo seasons 
Profile at BDFútbol

Seasons
Langreo
Association football lists by Spanish club